Tower of Souls is a 1995 isometric role playing video game by British studio Parys Technografx for Amiga and DOS, and later released for iOS and Windows Mobile.

Reception
Amiga Format gave a scathing review, describing it as "the most tediously clichéd tale of wretchedness". CU Amiga said that the gameplay was not praiseworthy. Amiga Joker offered praise for the beautiful aesthetics of the game.

British gaming magazine The One gave the Amiga version of Tower of Souls an overall score of 85%, stating: "It's difficult, if not impossible, to innovate in some genres of game ... However, Legend proved me wrong, and now Tower of Souls has taken the concept of Legend and applied a crackingly-good control system." The One praised the isometric perspective, but expressed that "it's difficult to judge the exact position of enemies. And something which looks like it's going to miss you often hits ... and with only one life, that's harsh."

References

External links

Tower of Souls at Hall of Light Amiga database

1995 video games
Amiga games
DOS games
IOS games
Role-playing video games
Video games developed in the United Kingdom
Video games with isometric graphics
Windows Mobile games